This is a list of sovereign states and dependent territories in the geographical region of Oceania. Although it is mostly ocean and spans many tectonic plates, Oceania is occasionally listed as one of the continents.

Most of this list follows the boundaries of geopolitical Oceania, which includes Australasia, Melanesia, Micronesia, and Polynesia. The main continental landmass of Oceania is Australia.

Boundaries of Oceania

The boundary between Southeast Asia and Oceania is not clearly defined. For political reasons, the United Nations considers the boundary between the two regions to be the Indonesian–Papua New Guinean border. Papua New Guinea is occasionally considered Asian as it neighbours Indonesia, but this is rare, and it is generally accepted to be part of Oceania. Biogeographically and geologically, Papua and West Papua provinces are parts of Oceania.

Likewise, there is also no clearly defined boundary between Latin America and Oceania; the mostly uninhabited oceanic Pacific islands near Latin America have been considered by some as part of Oceania, both historically and in present-day times. Nearly all of these islands have become politically associated with the Americas, but none lie on the respective tectonic plates of those continents, nor were any inhabited by Indigenous peoples of the Americas during the pre-Columbian era. Some share strong biogeographical affinities to geopolitical Oceania. The Malay Archipelago has historically been associated with Oceania, however, very few present-day definitions include it as part of Oceania. The Malay Archipelago lies on the continental shelf of Asia; Christmas Island and Cocos (Keeling) Islands (both adjacent to the Malay Archipelago) lie on the Australian tectonic plate, and are not politically associated with Asia. The Bonin Islands, which have been politically integrated into Japan, are not geologically associated with the Asian continent, and are biogeographically within Micronesia.

Sovereign states

United Nations member states
This section includes all sovereign states located predominantly in Oceania that are member states of the United Nations. All 14 states are full members of the Pacific Islands Forum.

Associated states 
Two states, the Cook Islands and Niue, are in free association with New Zealand. While maintaining a close constitutional and political relationship with New Zealand, both states are members of several United Nations specialized agencies with full treaty-making capacity, and have independently engaged in diplomatic relations with sovereign states under their own name. Both are also full members of the Pacific Islands Forum. Because of these features, they are sometimes considered to have de facto status as sovereign states.

Non-sovereign territories
The following are entities considered to be within Oceania that fall into one of these categories:

1. Federal territories of sovereign states located outside these states' mainland.

2. Territories that constitute integral parts of sovereign states in some form other than as federal territories, where a significant part of the sovereign state's landmass is located outside Oceania or the territory is located outside the sovereign state's mainland. Many of these territories are often described as dependencies or autonomous areas.

3. Dependent territories of sovereign states.

Two of these territories (French Polynesia and New Caledonia) are associate members of the Pacific Islands Forum, while five others (American Samoa, Guam, Northern Mariana Islands, Tokelau, and Wallis and Futuna) hold observer status within the organization.

See also

Oceania-related
 List of Oceanian countries by GDP (PPP)
 List of Oceanian countries by population
 List of predecessors of sovereign states in Oceania 
 List of sovereign states in Asia and Oceania by Human Development Index

Island countries
 List of Caribbean island countries by population
 List of island countries
 List of sovereign states and dependent territories in the Indian Ocean
 List of sovereign states and dependent territories in Eurasia

Notes

References

Oceania
 
Oceania-related lists

Dependent territories
Oceania
Lists of countries in Oceania